Manipur International University (MIU) is an autonomous private university recognized by the Government of Manipur.

History

The Manipur International University was established as per the Manipur International University Ordinance, 2018 (Manipur Ordinance No.1 of 2018) which was notified in the Official Gazette on 26 June 2018. It was continued and permanently recognised through the Manipur International University Act, 2018 (Manipur Act No. 2 of 2019) which was notified in the Official Gazette on 14 February 2019. It is recognised and listed by UGC as a "State Private University".

References 

Universities in Manipur
Education in Imphal
2018 establishments in Manipur
Educational institutions established in 2018
Private universities in India